Jesper Bo Parnevik (born 7 March 1965) is a Swedish professional golfer. He spent 38 weeks in the top 10 of the Official World Golf Ranking in 2000 and 2001.

Early years and amateur career
Parnevik was born in Botkyrka, Stockholm County, and is the son of Swedish entertainer Bosse Parnevik and his wife Gertie (b. 1940). He grew up in Åkersberga.

Parnevik became a member of the first group of students in Sweden to combine studying with golf training at the Swedish upper secondary sports school in Danderyd outside Stockholm. At age 15, Parnevik spent 10 days in Myrtle Beach, South Carolina, and developed an appreciation for life in the United States; he later moved to Palm Beach County, Florida, to attend Palm Beach Junior College in Lake Worth on a golf scholarship.

Parnevik was a member of the team representing Sweden at the 1984 and 1986 Eisenhower Trophy. He was also part of the Swedish team finishing second, after losing in the final against Scotland, at the 1985 European Amateur Team Championship on home soil in Halmstad, Sweden, where Parnevik won individually at the initial qualifying stroke-play competition.

Professional career
Parnevik turned professional in 1986. After winning the Swedish Golf Tour Order of Merit in 1988, including a runner-up finish to Vijay Singh at the 1988 Swedish PGA Championship, he scored four wins on the European Tour. His breakthrough came when he out-dueled Payne Stewart at the 1993 Scottish Open at Gleneagles King's Course.

With victories in 1995 and 1998, Parnevik became the first Swede to win twice on the European Tour on home soil. At his first victory at the Scandinavian Masters in 1995 at Barsebäck Golf & Country Club, he played 72 holes competition and 18 holes pro-am without a bogey, but with one double-bogey.

Based in Florida, he joined the PGA Tour in the mid-90s, subsequently winning five events. His playing career also includes three Ryder Cup appearances (1997, 1999, and 2002) and two runner-up finishes in The Open (1994 and 1997). His career best world ranking of seventh, which he attained on 14 May 2000, was the highest world ranking achieved by a Swedish golfer until Henrik Stenson reached the top five in February 2007.

In late 2000, Parnevik underwent hip surgery at the persuasion of Greg Norman, who had undergone similar surgery.

Parnevik finished second in the Valero Texas Open in October 2007, losing to Justin Leonard in a playoff. In 2009, after a tie for 17th at the SAS Masters in Sweden, Parnevik underwent further hip surgery in Vail, Colorado, United States, which cut short his 2009 season on the PGA Tour. He also cited the hip injury as the reason for his withdrawal from the PGA Tour Qualifying Tournament ("Q-School") in December 2009.

In 2010, Parnevik missed cuts in his first three tournaments and had to withdraw again after a first round 68 at the Northern Trust Open because of an ailing back. He had emergency surgery where it was discovered that he had a broken lumbar vertebrae that could put his career in jeopardy.

Parnevik played the 2011 PGA Tour season on a fully exempt status for his Top 50 All-Time Earnings ranking. He was allowed to reuse this one-time exemption after being able to play only five tournaments in 2010. He played the 2012 and 2013 seasons on a Medical Extension after suffering a severe injury to his right hand in a boating accident.

Plagued by injuries for years, Parnevik staged a comeback on the Champions Tour when he became eligible in 2015. He started 2016 with a tie for third at the Chubb Classic, losing out to former world number one golfers Bernhard Langer and Fred Couples. He got his first win on the Champions Tour in the same year at the Insperity Invitational.

Style
Parnevik is known for his distinctive and eccentric taste in clothes and fashion as well as his playing achievements, a fashion sense that led golf writer Dan Jenkins to describe him as "the last guy to climb out of the clown car at the circus". His on-course trademark was the upturned bill on his baseball cap. While on the European Ryder Cup team, he received a customized team cap with the Ryder Cup logo on the bottom of the bill instead of the front, so that it could be seen with the bill turned up. He has since stopped wearing the flipped-bill hat, opting for strawhats and visors but retains a flamboyant sense of fashion, such as disco-style purple trousers and other golf apparel designed by Johan Lindeberg. He has been politely described as "eclectic", and has been known to change outfits at the halfway stage of a round of tournament golf. Beginning in 2006, one of his new on-course fashion statements was a necktie worn under a vest. Puma Golf signed Jesper Parnevik in 2014 and he gets credited for his influence on their LUX Golf Appearel Line. Since wearing Puma Clothes he once again wears a custom made and more modern looking flipped bill hat. He is also known to eat volcanic dust as a dietary supplement. Parnevik's nickname on tour is "Spaceman".

Awards, personal life
In 1998, Parnevik was awarded honorary member of the PGA of Sweden.

He was awarded the 1999 Swedish Golfer of the Year.

In 2003, the three Swedish teammates of the victorious European Ryder Cup team the previous year, Niclas Fasth, Pierre Fulke and Parnevik, was each, by the Swedish Golf Federation, awarded the Golden Club, the highest award for contributions to Swedish golf, as the 30th, 31st and 32nd recipients.

Parnevik has an eclectic acting career, including a cameo in the 2007 comedy, Who's Your Caddy, in which he plays himself. An allegedly thoughtful historian in his free time, and a man with varied tastes, he was recently asked with whom he would like to have dinner. He quickly replied that it would have to be a choice between Albert Einstein and Elvis Presley. When told he could only have one, he shot back, "OK, Elvis Einstein."

Parnevik is credited with having introduced fellow professional golfer Tiger Woods to Swedish au pair Elin Nordegren (previously employed by Parnevik), whom Woods eventually married. Parnevik subsequently stated in 2009 that he regretted his responsibility for this introduction after reports of Woods' infidelity surfaced that year.

Parnevik and his family starred in a reality TV show, Parneviks, which aired on TV3 in Sweden for four seasons from 2015 to 2018, giving insights into his life in Florida. He is married to Mia Parnevik (née Sandsten 1968), and they have three daughters and one son. His oldest daughter Peg Parnevik has a career as a pop singer. Another daughter, Penny, has a relationship with Douglas Murray. His son  Phoenix is named after Parnevik's first PGA Tour win at the 1998 Phoenix Open.

Parnevik has a waterfront home in Tequesta, Florida.

Amateur wins
1985 Swedish Junior Stroke-play Championship

Professional wins (15)

PGA Tour wins (5)

PGA Tour playoff record (1–1)

European Tour wins (4)

European Tour playoff record (0–1)

Challenge Tour wins (1)

Swedish Golf Tour wins (2)

Other wins (2)
1988 Open Passing Shot (France)
1997 Johnnie Walker Super Tour

PGA Tour Champions wins (1)

Results in major championships

CUT = missed the half-way cut
DQ = Disqualified
"T" = tied

Summary

Most consecutive cuts made – 11 (1995 Open Championship – 1998 Open Championship)
Longest streak of top-10s – 2 (1999 Open Championship – 1999 PGA)

Results in The Players Championship

CUT = missed the halfway cut
"T" indicates a tie for a place

Results in World Golf Championships

1Cancelled due to 9/11

QF, R16, R32, R64 = Round in which player lost in match play
"T" = Tied
WD = Withdrew
NT = No tournament

Results in senior major championships

"T" indicates a tie for a place
CUT = missed the halfway cut
DQ = disqualified
NT = no tournament due to COVID-19 pandemic

Team appearances
Amateur
European Boys' Team Championship (representing Sweden): 1982
Jacques Léglise Trophy (representing the Continent of Europe): 1982
European Youths' Team Championship (representing Sweden): 1984
Eisenhower Trophy (representing Sweden): 1984, 1986
European Amateur Team Championship (representing Sweden): 1985
St Andrews Trophy (representing the Continent of Europe): 1986

Professional
Europcar Cup (representing Sweden): 1988 (winners)
Dunhill Cup (representing Sweden): 1993, 1994, 1995, 1997
World Cup (representing Sweden): 1994, 1995
Ryder Cup (representing Europe): 1997 (winners), 1999, 2002 (winners)

See also
1993 PGA Tour Qualifying School graduates

References

External links

Swedish male golfers
European Tour golfers
PGA Tour golfers
PGA Tour Champions golfers
Ryder Cup competitors for Europe
Palm Beach State College alumni
Sportspeople from Stockholm County
People from Botkyrka Municipality
People from Jupiter, Florida
1965 births
Living people